Africa '68 is a studio album by South African jazz musician Hugh Masekela released in 1968 via Uni Records label. It was probably recorded in New York circa 1966 and Los Angeles circa late 1967.

Track listing

Personnel
Hugh Masekela – trumpet, vocals
Bruce Langhorne – guitar
John Cartwright – bass
Momsie Gwangwa
Ernest Moholmi
Paul Makgoba
Philemon Hou
Jonas Gwangwa
Caiphus Semenya
Letta Mbulu – vocals
This is the probable list of credits. The exact performers are unknown.

References

External links

 

1968 albums
Uni Records albums
Hugh Masekela albums
Albums produced by Stewart Levine